Van Buren vs. Harrison may refer to one of two United States presidential elections between Martin Van Buren and William Henry Harrison:

 1836 United States presidential election, won by Martin Van Buren against William Henry Harrison
 1840 United States presidential election, won by William Henry Harrison against Martin Van Buren